An interactive course typically describes material of an educational nature delivered in a format which allows the user to directly impact the materials' content, pace, and outcome. Interactive, as defined by the Merriam-Webster online dictionary, is "involving the actions or input of a user". An example of such material would be a computer-based presentation requiring a user to select the correct answer to a given question before proceeding to the next topic.

Use
These types of courses are almost always computer-based, and most likely to be delivered to the user through the Internet. Due to their convenient delivery, availability, and almost endless subject matter, interactive courses have become a major tool for those seeking to provide, as well as to obtain, education, training, or certification in a given area of study.

With growing accessibility and availability of computers and the Internet, many schools, universities, businesses, and government agencies are turning to interactive courses to train and educate their students and staff through MOOC's and customized internal learning platforms by third-party providers.

References

External links
Interactive Displays For Education
Professional Development Training Course
Training Courses For Personal Development

Educational technology